Pascual Somma (1896 – 1930) was a Uruguayan footballer who played as a forward. He was part of Uruguay's squad for the 1924 Summer Olympics, but he did not play in any matches.

Career statistics

International

References

External links
 

1896 births
1930 deaths
Uruguayan footballers
Uruguay international footballers
Footballers from Montevideo
Association football forwards
Club Nacional de Football players
Defensor Sporting players